James Melvin Bilbrey (April 20, 1924 – December 26, 1985) was an American professional baseball player and a Major League Baseball pitcher who played one game for the St. Louis Browns.

External links

1924 births
1985 deaths
St. Louis Browns players
Major League Baseball pitchers
Baseball players from Tennessee
People from Overton County, Tennessee